The Sierra Leone Labour Congress (SLLC) is a national trade union center in Sierra Leone. It was founded in 1976.

The SLLC is affiliated with the International Trade Union Confederation.

James Baimba Kabia was Secretary General from 1977 to 1981.

See also

1926 Sierra Leone railway strike

References

Trade unions in Sierra Leone
International Trade Union Confederation
1976 establishments in Sierra Leone
Trade unions established in 1976